Caeau Nant y Llechau is a Site of Special Scientific Interest in Brecknock, Powys, Wales. It is the largest area of traditional unimproved hay meadow known in Brecknock. Over 110 species have been recorded in the grassland areas.

See also
List of Sites of Special Scientific Interest in Brecknock

References

Sites of Special Scientific Interest in Brecknock